Chartiers may refer to the following places in Pennsylvania:

Chartiers Creek, a tributary of the Ohio River
Little Chartiers Creek, a tributary of Chartiers Creek
Chartiers Run (Chartiers Creek), a tributary of Chartiers Creek
Chartiers Branch, of the Pennsylvania Railroad, followed Chartiers Creek
Chartiers Run (Allegheny River), a tributary of the Allegheny River
Chartier's Old Town, a former trading post named after Pierre Chartiers; was sited on present-day Tarentum, Pennsylvania 
Chartiers Township, Washington County, Pennsylvania
Chartiers-Houston School District, serves an area of Washington County, Pennsylvania
Chartiers Houston High School, in the above school district
Chartiers (Pittsburgh), a neighborhood in Pittsburgh
Chartiers Valley School District, serves an area southwest of Pittsburgh
Chartiers Valley High School, in the above school district

See also

Chartier (disambiguation)